Gleditsia  (honey locust) is a genus of  trees in the family Fabaceae, subfamily Caesalpinioideae, native to North America and Asia. The Latin name commemorates Johann Gottlieb Gleditsch, director of the Berlin Botanical Garden, who died in 1786.

Species
There are 12 species:
Gleditsia amorphoides (Griseb.) Taubert 
Gleditsia aquatica Marshall – water locust or swamp locust
Gleditsia assamica Bor
Gleditsia australis F. B. Forbes & Hemsley
Gleditsia caspica Desf. – Caspian locust or Persian honeylocust
Gleditsia fera (Lour.) Merr.
Gleditsia japonica Miq. – Japanese honey locust
Gleditsia medogensis Z.C.Ni
Gleditsia microphylla D.Gordon ex Y.T.Lee
Gleditsia rolfei S.Vidal
Gleditsia sinensis Lam. – Chinese honey locust
Gleditsia triacanthos L. – thorny honey locust

Hybrids
Gleditsia × texana Sarg. – Texas honey locust (=G. aquatica × triacanthos)

All the species are woody except for G. microphylla. Their ability to fix nitrogen is debated; see .

Range and Taxonomy 
Gleditsia is found in East Asia, on the East Coast of the Americas, and in South America; small populations of certain species also exist around the Caspian Sea (G. caspica) and India (G. assamica). There are native species to all these regions. The theory is that Gleditsia originated in East Asia in the Eocene, crossed the land bridge across the North Pacific Ocean into North America, and then spread down to South America millions of years later. Gymnocladus is a sister genus of Gleditsia, and it too mimicked this dispersion pattern, except it came to the Americas much earlier. Though there are no extant European Gleditsia species, there are fossils found in Europe which could mean that the genus also crossed the North Atlantic land bridge.

Certain Gleditsia species are in clades with species from other continents; an example is G. caspica (from the Caucusus), G. delavayi, and G. japonica (both from Asia), who are in a clade together. Gleditsia amorphoides is the most basal of the genus, most closely related to G. sinensis but not the North American species (G. aquatica and G. triacanthos).

Medicinal use
Gleditsia sinensis is one of the 50 fundamental herbs used in Chinese herbology, where it is called zào jiá (皂荚).

References

Bibliography
Philips, Roger. (1979). Trees of North America and Europe, Random House, Inc., New York .

 
Fabaceae genera
Caesalpinioideae